STKRJ Kampong Katok 'A', also known as STKRJ Kampong Tungku Area 3, is a public housing estate and designated village in Brunei-Muara District, Brunei. It is one of the villages within Mukim Gadong 'A'. The postcode is BE2919.

Geography 

Facilities 
Katok 'A' Primary School is the government primary school. It also shares grounds with Katok 'A' Religious School, the government school for the country's Islamic religious primary education.

See also 
 Kampong Katok 'B'
 STKRJ Tungku Area 1
 STKRJ Tungku Area 2

References 

Public housing estates in Brunei
Villages in Brunei-Muara District